Palleopa is a monotypic moth genus in the family Geometridae. Its only species, Palleopa innotata, the finely-streaked crest-moth, is known from Australia, including Tasmania. Both the genus and species were first described by Francis Walker in 1866.

The wingspan is about 60 mm. Adults have streaky brown forewings and pale hindwings.

The larvae feed on the foliage of Eucalyptus species. Young larvae are brown on top and off white underneath. They have a greenish dorsal stripe. Older instars are reddish brown with some black and white spots along the sides.

References

Nacophorini
Monotypic moth genera